Bakers Settlement  is a community in the Canadian province of Nova Scotia, located in the Lunenburg Municipal District in Lunenburg County.

References
Bakers Settlement on Destination Nova Scotia

Communities in Lunenburg County, Nova Scotia